Abbey Park School is a mixed secondary school in North Swindon, Wiltshire, England.

The school was called Isambard School when it was established in 2007. The name and uniform changed in 2017. In 2018, Abbey Park School became an academy, joining 'The Park Academies Trust'.

School houses
There are four school houses at Abbey Park School:
 Ennis-Hill
 Austen
 Churchill 
 Newton

Notable alumni
Tyreke Johnson — Class of 2015 (Footballer)

References

External links
 

Secondary schools in Swindon
Academies in Swindon
Educational institutions established in 2007
2007 establishments in England